Political suicide is a concept by which a politician or political party loses widespread support and confidence from the voting public by proposing actions that are seen as unfavourable or that might threaten the status quo. A politician who is seen as having committed political suicide might be forced to resign from either external public pressure (such as the threat of civil unrest) or internal pressure from superiors or colleagues. 

A political party as a whole could also lose much of its public support by deviating greatly from its core values and policies from which the party was founded on. For example, the phrase "the longest suicide note in history" is an epithet originally used by United Kingdom Labour Party MP Gerald Kaufman to describe his party's left wing manifesto of 1983. 

While natural deviation in policy is expected as history progresses, demographics change, and new challenges present themselves, too strong of an unexpected deviation from core values can be unpalatable to base supporters, resulting in a major loss of public confidence. The portmanteau "politicide" is also sometimes used. For example, in The Kansas City Star on 23 February 1996: "James didn't even finish his inaugural address before committing politicide."

See also
 Overton window
 Taboo
 Third rail of politics

References

Political terminology
English phrases